A Thousand for One Night (German: Tausend für eine Nacht) is a 1933 Czech-German comedy film directed by Max Mack and starring Claire Rommer, Trude Berliner and Harald Paulsen. A separate Czech-language version was also produced.

The film's sets were designed by Erich Zander. The film was partly shot on location at the Czech spa resort of Marienbad which was then part of the German-speaking Sudetenland. Its plot concerns a German mother who is anxious for her daughter to marry an aristocrat rather than a jazz musician.

Cast
Claire Rommer as Erika Lauff, daughter
Trude Berliner as Tanzsoubrette Ossy Walden  
Harald Paulsen as Frank Wellner, jazz musician
Jakob Tiedtke as Jakob Lauff 
Johanna Terwin as Adele, his wife  
Eugen Jensen as Haberland, her friend 
Willy Stettner as Peter Stengel, his nephew  
F.W. Schröder-Schrom 
Alfred Gerasch 
Alexander Murski
Kardosch-Sänger as Vocal group

References

Bibliography 
 Klaus, Ulrich J. Deutsche Tonfilme: Jahrgang 1933. Klaus-Archiv, 1988.

External links

1933 comedy films
Czech comedy films
Films of the Weimar Republic
German comedy films
Films directed by Max Mack
German films based on plays
German multilingual films
Films shot in the Czech Republic
UFA GmbH films
1933 multilingual films
1930s German films